The Société commerciale des transports et des ports (Commercial society of ports and transports), prior to 2011 known as the Office national des transports (National Office of Transports), or ONATRA, is a publicly owned company based in Kinshasa which operates railways, ports, and river transport in the north and west of the Democratic Republic of the Congo on the Congo River. It is the continuation of the Office of Colonial Transport (Office des transports coloniaux, OTRACO) founded in 1935 and has subsequently existed under other names.

History 

The 'Office des transports coloniaux (or "Colonial transport agency, OTRACO) was established, in 1935, as a public body, and renamed the Office des transports au Congo (OTRACO) in 1960, finally becoming the "Office National des Transports" (ONATRA) in 1971.

In 1973, ONATRA carried its largest number of passengers ever, a total of 410,871.

In 1977, the government decided to end ONATRA's monopoly of river transport, and to allow any individual or company to own and operate river boats.

Decline in the state of its assets, together with competition, led to a sharp decline, so that by 1982, it only carried 121,779 passengers.

Network 

The network includes:
Matadi-Kinshasa Railway, under an agreement with the Congo Railroad Company;
Rivers and lakes network
 From Boma to Banana (ferry Kalamu);
 River Congo and Kasai River (and their tributaries);
Ports 
 Ocean ports of Matadi and Boma
 River ports Kinshasa, Mbandaka and Kisangani

Timeline

2008 

 New locomotives

Basketball team
The company has a basketball team, named BC SCTP, that is the most decorated club in Congolese history. They have won 18 Coupe du Congo titles.

See also 

 Rail transport in the Democratic Republic of the Congo
 Transport in the Democratic Republic of the Congo

References

External links 
 Office National des Transports du RDC

Railway companies of the Democratic Republic of the Congo
Transport companies established in 1935
1935 establishments in the Belgian Congo